The Story Without a Name is an 1882 novel by the French writer Jules Barbey d'Aurevilly. It tells the story of an inexplicable pregnancy and the destructive consequences it has for its surroundings.

An English translation by Edgar Saltus was published in 1891. Saltus, a writer associated with the decadent movement, took some liberties in his translation, and upon the original publication, several American critics thought the novel was his own work and that Barbey d'Aurevilly was his literary invention.

References

External links

 The Story Without a Name at Internet Archive

1882 French novels
French-language novels
Novels by Jules Barbey d'Aurevilly